The Eparchy of Temišvar ( or ) is a diocese or eparchy of the Serbian Orthodox Church, having jurisdiction over the territory of Romania. The see of the eparchy is in Timișoara ( or ).

Bishops
List of Serbian Orthodox Bishops of Temišvar:
 Neofit (1608);
 Isaija (1640);
 Josif (1643);
 Teodor (1643);
 Sevastijan (1644, 1647);
 Mihajl (1681—1687);
 Vasilije (1688);
 Josif II (1688);
 Vasilije (1693);
 Isaija Đaković (1695—1710);
 Konstantin Grk (1704-1713);
 Joanikije Vladisavljević (1713-1727);
 Nikola Dimitrijević (1728-1744);
 Georgije Popović (1745-1757);
 Vikentije Jovanović-Vidak (1759-1774);
 Mojsej Putnik (1774-1781);
 Sofronije Kirilović (1781-1786);
 Petar Petrović (1786-1800);
 Stefan Avakumović (1801-1822);
 Josif Putnik (1829-1830);
 Maksim Manulović (1833-1838);
 Pantelejmon Živković (1839-1851);
 Samuilo Maširević (1853-1864);
 Antonije Nako (1864-1869);
 Georgije Vojnović (1874-1881);
 Georgije Branković (1882-1890);
 Nikanor Popović (1891-1901);
 Georgije Letić (1904-1931);
 Lukijan Pantelić (1999-2002);

Monasteries
 Bazjaš monastery (Baziaș)
 Monastery of Sveti Đurađ (Gătaia)
  (Zlatița)
 Monastery of Bezdin (Munar)

See also
Serbs in Romania

References

Serbian Orthodox Church in Romania
Religious sees of the Serbian Orthodox Church
Dioceses in Romania
Religious organizations based in Timișoara
Dioceses established in the 16th century